A grey swan is an event which is known and possible to happen, but assumed not very likely to happen. The term derives from black swan theory, which describes an event which is unlikely but unknown.

In electrical engineering, gray swan refers to the kind of events that rarely happens but have great impact on power system.

See also
 Resilience (engineering and construction)
 Resilient control systems

References

Metaphors referring to birds